Selmer Adolf Jackson (May 7, 1888 – March 30, 1971) was an American stage film and television actor. He appeared in nearly 400 films between 1921 and 1963. His name was sometimes spelled Selmar Jackson.

Jackson was born in Lake Mills, Iowa and died in Burbank, California from a heart attack.

Jackson gained early acting experience in stock theater, working with groups such as the Des Moines Stock Company. Jackson's screen debut was in the silent film The Supreme Passion (1921).

On March 30, 1971, Jackson died of a heart attack in Burbank, California. He was 82.

Filmography

 The Supreme Passion (1921) – Clara's Beau
 Thru Different Eyes (1929) – King (defense attorney)
 Why Bring That Up? (1929) – Eddie
 Lovin' the Ladies (1930) – George Van Horne
 Brothers (1930) – Assistant Defense Attorney (uncredited)
 Madonna of the Streets (1930) – Kingsley's Partner (uncredited)
 Dirigible (1931) – Lt. Rowland (uncredited)
 Subway Express (1931) – Mason
 The Secret Call (1931) – Matt Stanton
 Left Over Ladies (1931) – Churchill
 The Big Timer (1932) – Jim Colton (uncredited)
 Play Girl (1932) – Horserace Announcer (uncredited)
 Shopworn (1932) – Murray – Headwaiter (uncredited)
 The Mouthpiece (1932) – Prison Clerk (uncredited)
 The Strange Love of Molly Louvain (1932) – Detective Charlie (uncredited)
 Winner Take All (1932) – Ring Announcer (uncredited)
 Doctor X (1932) – Willard Keefe – Daily World Night Editor (uncredited)
 Two Against the World (1932) – Radio Commentator (uncredited)
 Big City Blues (1932) – Joe (uncredited)
 Three on a Match (1932) – Radio Announcer (voice, uncredited)
 You Said a Mouthful (1932) – Jones – Attorney (uncredited)
 Luxury Liner (1933) – Older Man (uncredited)
 Forgotten (1933) – Hans Strauss
 The Little Giant (1933) – Radio Announcer (voice, uncredited)
 The Working Man (1933) – Hartland Co. Man (uncredited)
 Picture Snatcher (1933) – Joe Chase – Record Editor (uncredited)
 Brief Moment (1933) – Conover (uncredited)
 Police Car 17 (1933) – Police Radio Dispatcher (uncredited)
 After Tonight (1933) – Intelligence Officer (uncredited)
 Blood Money (1933) – Man in District Attorney's Office (uncredited)
 Hell and High Water (1933) – Lt. Saunders (uncredited)
 Let's Fall in Love (1933) – Barton (uncredited)
 I've Got Your Number (1934) – Joe—Gangster
 Sisters Under the Skin (1934) – Mullen
 Stand Up and Cheer! (1934) – White House Correspondent (uncredited)
 The Witching Hour (1934) – Henry Walthall (uncredited)
 Sadie McKee (1934) – Tiffany Salesman (uncredited)
 Fog Over Frisco (1934) – Radio Announcer (uncredited)
 Most Precious Thing in Life (1934) – Game Announcer (uncredited)
 Now I'll Tell (1934) – Decker (uncredited)
 The Defense Rests (1934) – Duffy
 Blind Date (1934) – George E. Martin (uncredited)
 The Richest Girl in the World (1934) – Dr. Harvey (uncredited)
 6 Day Bike Rider (1934) – Announcer (uncredited)
 I'll Fix It (1934) – Crawley (uncredited)
 Jealousy (1934) – Radio Announcer (uncredited)
 Murder in the Clouds (1934) – Radio Announcer (voice, uncredited)
 Bright Eyes (1934) – Ned's Attorney (uncredited)
 The Secret Bride (1934) – Vincent's Counsel (uncredited)
 The Best Man Wins (1935) – O'Neill (uncredited)
 Red Hot Tires (1935) – Prosecuting Attorney Charles M. Yaghem (uncredited)
 Devil Dogs of the Air (1935) – Medical Officer (uncredited)
 Carnival (1935) – Baby Judge (uncredited)
 The Great Hotel Murder (1935) – Railroad Ticket Agent (uncredited)
 Living on Velvet (1935) – Captain at Flying Field (uncredited)
 Traveling Saleslady (1935) – J.C. Scoville
 $10 Raise (1935) – Real Estate Agent (uncredited)
 Let 'Em Have It (1935) – Bertillion Instructor (uncredited)
 Public Hero No. 1 (1935) – Simpson – Prison Board Member (uncredited)
 In Caliente (1935) – Graphic Artist (uncredited)
 Chinatown Squad (1935) – Detective (uncredited)
 Alibi Ike (1935) – Second Radio Announcer (uncredited)
 Front Page Woman (1935) – Joe Davis
 The Murder Man (1935) – Lt. White – Ballistics Expert (uncredited)
 Don't Bet on Blondes (1935) – Gambler Who Bet $30,000 (uncredited)
 Broadway Gondolier (1935) – Program Director (uncredited)
 Page Miss Glory (1935) – Radio Announcer (uncredited)
 Red Salute (1935) – Army Officer #2
 Navy Wife (1935) – Doctor (uncredited)
 She Married Her Boss (1935) – Andrews (uncredited)
 The Public Menace (1935) – Chief Steward (uncredited)
 This Is the Life (1935) – Mr. Walters (uncredited)
 Shipmates Forever (1935) – Cmdr. Gibbs (uncredited)
 Grand Exit (1935) – District Attorney Cope
 A Night at the Opera (1935) – Committeeman (uncredited)
 Paddy O'Day (1936) – Ship's Officer (uncredited)
 Next Time We Love (1936) – Dr. Campbell (uncredited)
 It Had to Happen (1936) – Minor Role (uncredited)
 The Bridge of Sighs (1936) – Defense Attorney Alan Adams
 The Great Ziegfeld (1936) – Barber Shop Customer (uncredited)
 The Singing Kid (1936) – IRS Head J.A. Hanson (uncredited)
  Show Boat (1936) – Hotel Clerk (uncredited)
 Educating Father (1936) – Prof. Howard (uncredited)
 The Golden Arrow (1936) – Lorimer (uncredited)
 Revolt of the Zombies (1936) – Officer (uncredited)
 Little Miss Nobody (1936) – Judge Gibson (uncredited)
 Parole! (1936) – Earl Bigbee
 Easy Money (1936) – Mr. Harrison
 Public Enemy's Wife (1936) – Duffield
 The Bride Walks Out (1936) – Mr. Barrows – International Steel (uncredited)
 Charlie Chan at the Race Track (1936) – J.L. Lansing, Racing Secretary (uncredited)
 Postal Inspector (1936) – Chief Postal Inspector (uncredited)
 Sing, Baby, Sing (1936) – City Editor (uncredited)
 My Man Godfrey (1936) – Blake – Socialite (uncredited)
 Libeled Lady (1936) – Adams – Washington Chronicle Editor (uncredited)
 The Magnificent Brute (1936) – Dr. Coleman
 Ace Drummond (1936, Serial) – William Meredith Sr. (uncredited)
 Robinson Crusoe of Clipper Island (1936) – Mr. Canfield
 The Accusing Finger (1936) – Medical Examiner (uncredited)
 Wanted! Jane Turner (1936) – Ferris – Postal Inspector (uncredited)
 Charlie Chan at the Opera (1936) – Hudson – Wire-Photo Technician (uncredited)
 Stowaway (1936) – Randall's Lawyer in Reno (uncredited)
 Three Smart Girls (1936) – Hamilton (uncredited)
 Jungle Jim (1937, Serial) – Attorney Tyler [Ch.1]
 Man of the People (1937) – Governor (uncredited)
 Girl Overboard (1937) – Capt. Hartman (uncredited)
 Breezing Home (1937) – Steward (uncredited)
 Two Wise Maids (1937) – Dr. MacIntyre
 A Family Affair (1937) – Hoyt Wells
 Behind the Headlines (1937) – J.H. Scott, FBI (uncredited)
 Charlie Chan at the Olympics (1937) – Navy Commander (uncredited)
 The Man in Blue (1937) – District Attorney
 The Case of the Stuttering Bishop (1937) – Victor Stockton
 The 13th Man (1937) – Andrew Baldwin
 Between Two Women (1937) – Dr. Shanklin (uncredited)
 Meet the Boyfriend (1937) – Madison
 Reported Missing (1937) – C. J. Fleming FBI (uncredited)
 The Man Who Cried Wolf (1937) – Defense Attorney (uncredited)
 My Dear Miss Aldrich (1937) – Captain (scenes deleted)
 Hot Water (1937) – Maxwell
 The Wrong Road (1937) – Judge
 The Westland Case (1937) – The Warden
 West of Shanghai (1937) – Harry Hemingway (uncredited)
 Federal Bullets (1937) – Harker
 Manhattan Merry-Go-Round (1937) – J. Henry Thorne (uncredited)
 The Duke Comes Back (1937) – Jim Watson
 You're Only Young Once (1937) – Hoyt Wells
 Smashing the Vice Trust (1937) – District Attorney
 Wise Girl (1937) – Lawyer Barton #2 (uncredited)
 Midnight Intruder (1938) – Judge Hammond
 Mad About Music (1938) – Reporter (uncredited)
 Prison Nurse (1938) – Parker
 Arson Gang Busters (1938) – Commissioner Benton
 Alexander's Ragtime Band (1938) – Manager Radio Station
 Crime Ring (1938) – Ernie – Lawyer (uncredited)
 Little Tough Guy (1938) – 3rd Judge (uncredited)
 The Chaser (1938) – Second Judge (uncredited)
 Gateway (1938) – Inspector (uncredited)
 The Missing Guest (1938) – Frank Baldrich
 Personal Secretary (1938) – Blackmere (defense attorney)
 Secrets of an Actress (1938) – Thompson
 Too Hot to Handle (1938) – Coast Guard Captain (uncredited)
 Garden of the Moon (1938) – Doctor (uncredited)
 Down in 'Arkansaw' (1938) – Edwards
 Flight to Fame (1938) – Jules Peabody
 Gangster's Boy (1938) – Judge Roger Davis
 The Law West of Tombstone (1938) – New York Judge (uncredited)
 Secrets of a Nurse (1938) – Assistant District Attorney (uncredited)
 Gambling Ship (1938) – Steve Riley
 Pacific Liner (1939) – San Francisco Port Doctor (uncredited)
 Stand Up and Fight (1939) – Whittingham P. Talbot (scenes deleted)
 Off the Record (1939) – Det. Mendall
 Wings of the Navy (1939) – First Doctor (uncredited)
 Society Lawyer (1939) – District Attorney (uncredited)
 Mr. Moto in Danger Island (1939) – Doctor (uncredited)
 Undercover Agent (1939) – John Graham
 Confessions of a Nazi Spy (1939) – Customs Official (uncredited)
 Union Pacific (1939) – Jerome (uncredited)
 Outside These Walls (1939) – John Wilson
 Sorority House (1939) – Mr. Grant
 Inside Information (1939) – Alfred Huxley
 6,000 Enemies (1939) – Judge (uncredited)
 Naughty but Nice (1939) – Plaintiff's Attorney (uncredited)
 Five Came Back (1939) – Airline Official (uncredited)
 The Forgotten Woman (1939) – Man (uncredited)
 Each Dawn I Die (1939) – Editor Patterson (uncredited)
 The Under-Pup (1939) – Lawyer (uncredited)
 The Star Maker (1939) – Doctor
 Calling All Marines (1939) – Col. C.B. Vincent
 Espionage Agent (1939) – Instructor (uncredited)
 The Escape (1939) – Mr. Henley (uncredited)
 Scandal Sheet (1939) – Douglas Haynes
 On Dress Parade (1939) – Capt. Evans Dover
 20,000 Men a Year (1939) – C.A.A. Official (uncredited)
 Blondie Brings Up Baby (1939) – Tom Malcolm (uncredited)
 Missing Evidence (1939) – Manager (uncredited)
 Reno (1939) – Disbarment Lawyer (uncredited)
 Two Thoroughbreds (1939) – Bill Conway
 Private Detective (1939) – Simmy Sanger
 The Honeymoon's Over (1939) – Madden (uncredited)
 South of the Border (1939) – American Consul
 Swanee River (1939) – Army Medical Examiner (uncredited)
 Invisible Stripes (1939) – Police Lieutenant (uncredited)
 The Green Hornet (1940, Serial) – District Attorney [Chs. 4, 10]
 The Man Who Wouldn't Talk (1940) – James Sawyer (uncredited)
 Abe Lincoln in Illinois (1940) – Aide to Stephen Douglas (uncredited)
 The Grapes of Wrath (1940) – Inspection Officer
 The Man from Dakota (1940) – Surgeon (uncredited)
 Honeymoon Deferred (1940) – Frederick Johnson (uncredited)
 Teddy, the Rough Rider (1940, Short) – John W. Riggs, Cabinet Member (uncredited)
 The Marines Fly High (1940) – Medical Officer (uncredited)
 Johnny Apollo (1940) – Warden
 Son of the Navy (1940) – Capt. Parker
 Forty Little Mothers (1940) – Missing Persons Detective (uncredited)
 If I Had My Way (1940) – Mr. Melville (uncredited)
 On Their Own (1940)
 Murder in the Air (1940) – Capt. Riddell – Naval Hospital Doctor (uncredited)
 Florian (1940) – Desk Sergeant (uncredited)
 Babies for Sale (1940) – Arthur Kingsley
 Wagons Westward (1940) – Major Marlowe
 Queen of the Mob (1940) – Frederick Smith (uncredited)
 Sailor's Lady (1940) – Executive Officer
 Millionaires in Prison (1940) – Dr. Harry Lindsay
 Military Academy (1940) – Mr. Blake (uncredited)
 Brigham Young (1940) – Caleb Kent
 Men Against the Sky (1940) – Capt. Sanders
 Hired Wife (1940) – Hudson (uncredited)
 Public Deb No. 1 (1940) – Lawyer (uncredited)
 No Time for Comedy (1940) – First-Nighter (uncredited)
 I'm Still Alive (1940) – Baxter (uncredited)
 City for Conquest (1940) – Doctor
 Glamour for Sale (1940) – Police Chief Thomas (uncredited)
 The Ape (1940) – Dr. McNulty
 Girls Under 21 (1940) – Judge Frank P. Wallace (uncredited)
 Gallant Sons (1940) – Henry, Gambling Man (uncredited)
 Lady with Red Hair (1940) – Henry DeMille
 Santa Fe Trail (1940) – Officer Reading Names of Graduates (uncredited)
 Bowery Boy (1940) – Dr. Crane
 Buck Privates (1941) – Capt. Johnson (uncredited)
 Back Street (1941) – Arthur (uncredited)
 Nice Girl? (1941) – General (uncredited)
 Meet John Doe (1941) – Radio Announcer at Convention (uncredited)
 The Man Who Lost Himself (1941) – Mr. Green
 She Knew All the Answers (1941) – Broker
 Love Crazy (1941) – Doctor at Susan's Apartment (uncredited)
 Tight Shoes (1941) – Larry – District Attorney
 Paper Bullets (1941) – District Attorney
 Blossoms in the Dust (1941) – Texas Senator (uncredited)
 Sergeant York (1941) – Gen. Duncan (uncredited)
 The Shepherd of the Hills (1941) – Doctor (uncredited)
 Three Sons o' Guns (1941) – Draft Board Chairman (uncredited)
 Here Comes Mr. Jordan (1941) – Board Member (uncredited)
 International Squadron (1941) – Saunders
 Parachute Battalion (1941) – Thomas Morse
 Dr. Kildare's Wedding Day (1941) – Dr. Whitney (uncredited)
 Navy Blues (1941) – Capt. Willard (uncredited)
 It Started with Eve (1941) – Henry – Hotel Guest (uncredited)
 International Lady (1941) – Colonel (uncredited)
 The Devil Pays Off (1941) – Adm. Curtiss (uncredited)
 They Died with Their Boots On (1941) – Capt. McCook (uncredited)
 Road to Happiness (1941) – Sam Rankin
 Remember the Day (1941) – Graham
 Dick Tracy vs. Crime, Inc. (1941, Serial) – Army Officer (uncredited)
 A Date with the Falcon (1942) – Mr. Wallis (uncredited)
 The Power of God (1942) – The Pastor
 Dr. Kildare's Victory (1942) – Mr. Jackson (uncredited)
 Frisco Lil (1942) – McIntyre
 Joe Smith, American (1942) – Hospital Doctor (uncredited)
 Sing Your Worries Away (1942) – Producer (uncredited)
 Secret Agent of Japan (1942) – American Naval Captain
 True to the Army (1942) – Congressman
 The Strange Case of Doctor Rx (1942) – Judge (uncredited)
 Saboteur (1942) – FBI Chief (uncredited)
 Romance on the Range (1942) – Harrison (uncredited)
 Meet the Stewarts (1942) – Club Member (uncredited)
 My Favorite Spy (1942) – Minister at Wedding (uncredited)
 The Falcon Takes Over (1942) – Laird Burnett (uncredited)
 Miss Annie Rooney (1942) – Mr. Thomas
 Ten Gentlemen from West Point (1942) – Sersen
 Powder Town (1942) – Mr. Tuttle (uncredited)
 Thru Different Eyes (1942) – Chaplain
 Cairo (1942) – Captain, USS Hiawatha (uncredited)
 The Secret Code (1942, Serial) – Maj. Henry Barton
 Get Hep to Love (1942) – George Arnold – Insurance Man (uncredited)
 Thunder Birds (1942) – Minor Role
 Madame Spy (1942) – Harrison K. Woods
 When Johnny Comes Marching Home (1942) – Maj. Donaldson (uncredited)
 Margin for Error (1943) – Coroner (uncredited)
 You Can't Beat the Law (1943) – Mr. Bedford
 It Ain't Hay (1943) – Grant
 Harrigan's Kid (1943) – Mr. Ranley
 The Falcon in Danger (1943) – Airport Official (uncredited)
 Honeymoon Lodge (1943) – Carol's Lawyer (uncredited)
 Someone to Remember (1943) – Mr. Freeman (uncredited)
 Adventures of the Flying Cadets (1943, Serial) – Prof. Mason [Chs. 11–13]
 Guadalcanal Diary (1943) – Col. Thompson (uncredited)
 Around the World (1943) – Consul (uncredited)
 What a Woman! (1943) – Bruce (uncredited)
 The Fighting Sullivans (1944) – Damage Control Officer (uncredited)
 Hey, Rookie (1944) – Col. Robbins
 Stars on Parade (1944) – J. L. Carson
 A Night of Adventure (1944) – Washington D.C. Official (uncredited)
 Roger Touhy, Gangster (1944) – Principal Keeper (uncredited)
 Marine Raiders (1944) – Colonel at Guadalcanal (uncredited)
 Wing and a Prayer (1944) – Admiral (uncredited)
 The Big Noise (1944) – Mr. Manning of the Patent Office (uncredited)
 Heavenly Days (1944) – Sunday Editor (uncredited)
 She's a Sweetheart (1944) – General
 Destiny (1944) – Warden (uncredited)
 Sheriff of Las Vegas (1944) – Arthur Stanton
 Forever Yours (1945) – Williams
 Dillinger (1945) – Dr. Rex Spang (uncredited)
 Circumstantial Evidence (1945) – Warden
 Escape in the Desert (1945) – FBI Chief (uncredited)
 Thrill of a Romance (1945) – 2nd Hotel Monte Belva Clerk (uncredited)
 A Sporting Chance (1945) – John Smalley
 Out of This World (1945) – Doctor (uncredited)
 The Caribbean Mystery (1945) – Dr. Herbert Merryman (uncredited)
 First Yank Into Tokyo (1945) – Col. Blaine (uncredited)
 The Royal Mounted Rides Again (1945, Serial) – RCMP Superintendent MacDonald
 This Love of Ours (1945) – Dr. Melnik
 Dakota (1945) – Dr. Judson
 Allotment Wives (1945) – Deacon Sam
 Black Market Babies (1945) – Mr. Henry Andrews
 Shock (1946) – Dr. Blair (uncredited)
 Girl on the Spot (1946) – Ridgeway (uncredited)
 Johnny Comes Flying Home (1946) – Dr. Gunderson (uncredited)
 Mysterious Intruder (1946) – Dr. Connell (uncredited)
 The Glass Alibi (1946) – Dr. John F. Lawson
 The French Key (1946) – Walter Winslow
 She Wrote the Book (1946) – Fielding
 The Time of Their Lives (1946) – Mr. Dibbs – Museum Curator (uncredited)
 Dangerous Money (1946) – Ship's Doctor
 Child of Divorce (1946) – Dr. Sterling
 Wife Wanted (1946) – Lowell Cornell (uncredited)
 Boston Blackie and the Law (1946) – Warden Lund (uncredited)
 San Quentin (1946) – Rev. Eckles (uncredited)
 The Thirteenth Hour (1947) – Judge Collins (uncredited)
 The Beginning or the End (1947) – Senior Engineer (uncredited)
 A Likely Story (1947) – Doctor in Elevator (uncredited)
 Sarge Goes to College (1947) – Marine Capt. R.S. Handler
 Stepchild (1947) – Judge
 The Pretender (1947) – Charles Lennox
 Magic Town (1947) – Stringer
 Key Witness (1947) – Edward Clemmons
 Bury Me Dead (1947) – Rev. Dr. Foster (uncredited)
 Cass Timberlane (1947) – Dr. Leskett (uncredited)
 The Fabulous Texan (1947) – Flanigan (uncredited)
 Her Husband's Affairs (1947) – Judge (uncredited)
 Heading for Heaven (1947) – Doctor
 High Wall (1947) – Police Insp. Harding (uncredited)
 The Cobra Strikes (1948) – Dr. Keating
 King of the Gamblers (1948) – Judge
 The Fuller Brush Man (1948) – Henry Seward (uncredited)
 Stage Struck (1948) – Mr. Howard
 Dream Girl (1948) – Judge 'Jed' Allerton (uncredited)
 Blonde Ice (1948) – DA Ed Chalmers
 Pitfall (1948) – Ed Brawley
 The Gentleman from Nowhere (1948) – District Attorney (uncredited)
 The Girl from Manhattan (1948) – Dr. Moseby
 Sealed Verdict (1948) – Dr. Bossin, US Army
 The Dark Past (1948) – Warden Benson (uncredited)
 Every Girl Should Be Married (1948) – Clergyman (uncredited)
 Alaska Patrol (1949) – Capt. Wright
 The Crime Doctor's Diary (1949) – Warden (uncredited)
 Tulsa (1949) – Oilman (uncredited)
 Sorrowful Jones (1949) – Doctor (uncredited)
 The Fountainhead (1949) – Cortlandt Official (uncredited)
 Forgotten Women (1949) – Judge Donnell
 Mighty Joe Young (1949) – Judge (uncredited)
 Renegades of the Sage (1949) – Brown
 Mark of the Gorilla (1950) –  Warden Frank R. Bentley
 Gunmen of Abilene (1950) – Dr. Johnson
 No Man of Her Own (1950) – Minister (uncredited)
 Lucky Losers (1950) – David J. Thurstinn
 Pygmy Island (1950) – Army Officer at Pentagon (uncredited)
 The Magnificent Yankee (1950) – Mr. Amboy (uncredited)
 The Flying Missile (1950) – Col. Halliburton (uncredited)
 Bowery Battalion (1951) – Col. Masters
 Up Front (1951) – General (uncredited)
 Buckaroo Sheriff of Texas (1951) – Governor
 That's My Boy (1951) – Doc Hunter
 Purple Heart Diary (1951) – Col. Tappen
 Elopement (1951) – Dr. Halsey (uncredited)
 Captain Video (1951, Serial) – J.R. Wade-Deputy Commissioner of Public Safety (uncredited)
 Indian Uprising (1952) – Commissioner of Indian Affairs (uncredited)
 Deadline - U.S.A. (1952) – Williams (uncredited)
 Young Man with Ideas (1952) – Merritt Crayton – Attorney (uncredited)
 Montana Territory (1952) – Banker (uncredited)
 Washington Story (1952) – Party Guest Greeting Ambassador (uncredited)
 We're Not Married! (1952) – Chaplain Hall (uncredited)
 Sudden Fear (1952) – Dr. Van Roan (uncredited)
 Ruby Gentry (1952) – Club Member at Bar (uncredited)
 Jack McCall, Desperado (1953) – Col. Brand
 Rebel City (1953) – Col. Barnes (uncredited)
 The President's Lady (1953) – Col. Green (uncredited)
 Sky Commando (1953) – Gen. Carson
 Crazylegs (1953) – President of Michigan Alumni Association (uncredited)
 Demetrius and the Gladiators (1954) – Senator (uncredited)
 Seven Angry Men (1955) – Ralph Waldo Emerson (uncredited)
 The Eternal Sea (1955) – V.I.P. (uncredited)
 Devil Goddess (1955) – Prof. Carl Blakely
 Autumn Leaves (1956) – Mr. Wetherby
 Three Brave Men (1956) – Retired Admiral (uncredited)
 Hellcats of the Navy (1957) – Fleet Adm. Chester W. Nimitz (uncredited)
 The Lost Missile (1958) – Secretary of State
 The Atomic Submarine (1959) – Adm. Terhune
 The Gallant Hours (1960) – Adm. Chester W. Nimitz (uncredited)
 The Wheeler Dealers (1963) – Businessman (uncredited)

References

External links

1888 births
1971 deaths
20th-century American male actors
American male film actors
Burials at Valhalla Memorial Park Cemetery
Male actors from Iowa
People from Lake Mills, Iowa